The 1997 Men's South American Volleyball Championship, took place in 1997 in Caracas.

Final positions

Mens South American Volleyball Championship, 1997
Men's South American Volleyball Championships
1997 in South American sport
International volleyball competitions hosted by Venezuela 
1997 in Venezuelan sport